Tung-Mow Yan (born 1937) is a Taiwanese-born American physicist, who has specialized in theoretical particle physics; primarily in the structure of elementary particles, the standard model, and quantum chromodynamics. He is professor emeritus at Cornell University.

Education

He graduated with a BS in physics in 1960 at National Taiwan University (NTU), an MS in physics at National Tsing Hua University (Hsinchu) in 1962, and earned a Ph.D. in physics in 1968 at Harvard University, under the supervision of Julian Schwinger.

Research

From 1970 to 2009 Yan worked at Cornell University, in particular the Cornell High-Energy Synchrotron Source and Laboratory for Elementary-Particle Physics (combined into the Cornell Laboratory for Accelerator-based Sciences and Education as of 2006). He became a professor in 19??. By 2010 he reached the status of professor emeritus in physics.

Other affiliations during Yan's life and work are:

1968–1970: research associate at SLAC
1973–1974: visiting scientist to SLAC
1977–1978: scientific associate at CERN
1974–1978: Sloan Fellowship
1986: visiting chair professor at the physics department of NTU
Since 1991: a fellow of the American Physical Society
1991–1992: special chair professor,  Institute of Physics, Academia Sinica, ROC
1997: Director,  National Center of Theoretical Sciences, ROC

In the 1970s, Yan and Sidney Drell investigated  the important Drell–Yan process of massive lepton pair production in hadronic collisions, which provides a crucial experimental probe into the parton distribution functions. These  describe the way that the momentum of an incoming high-energy nucleon is partitioned among its constituent partons.

In the same decade, he pioneered the "Cornell potential" shedding light on the properties of heavy quark–antiquark systems (charmonium),  with Estia J. Eichten, Toichiro Kinoshita, Ken Lane and Kurt Gottfried.

Works

Tung-Mow Yan is the author or co-author of the following books:

and numerous physics publications in collaboration with other theoretical physicists, including Kurt Gottfried and Sidney Drell.

According to INSPIRE-HEP, as of 2016, he has authored or co-authored at least 72 publications, and has at least 11945 citations.

References

External links
 
 

Chinese physicists
Theoretical physicists
Particle physicists
Cornell University faculty
Fellows of the American Physical Society
Harvard Graduate School of Arts and Sciences alumni
People associated with CERN
1937 births
Living people
National Taipei University alumni
National Tsing Hua University alumni